Membership and supporter status within political parties in the United Kingdom typically contain restrictions including:

 Age restrictions
 Citizenship restrictions
 A commitment to the party's principles
 Limiting holding membership of other political parties
 Limiting standing against officially endorsed candidates
 Membership of specifically prohibited political parties
 Personal conduct expectations and party rule compliance

Practically, involvement in a political party without membership may limit an individual's involvement. Parties that offer a lower level of affiliation, such as supporter status tend to have looser constraints.

History
Membership of political parties has been in decline in the UK since the 1950s, falling by over 65% from 1983 (4 per cent of the electorate) to 2005 (1.3 per cent). Typically party affiliation allows an individual to support only a single party. However a notable exception to this is the Co-operative Party which supports only Labour and the SDLP.

According to the UK Parliament website sourced from a report by Olympic Britain, during the 1950s there were 2.8 million members of the Conservative Party and 1 million Labour Party members. In the years after 1945 until the early 1990s, supporters of the Socialist and Cooperative parties and trade unions linked with the Labour Party increased the overall Labour Party movement by 5 to 6 million, from which point they began to fall and currently number about 3.5 million.

Despite being founded in 1900, the Labour Party didn't begin keeping track of its membership until 1928. On the other hand, the Conservative Party rarely releases their total membership statistics, additionally, there are no clear membership statistics for the Conservative party before 1945, although it is estimated that between WW1 and WW2, membership levels were around 1.5 million, however, exact numbers are unknown.

Current membership 
Some political parties in the UK disclose their membership, some do not, there is no legal or electoral obligation to give figures let alone accurate figures. Some parties are active in and contest seats throughout the entire United Kingdom, whereas others are only active and contest seats in a particular country or countries in the UK.

Enforcement 
There are few high-profile cases of membership criteria enforcement and as such tend to happen under exceptional circumstances.

2015 Labour leadership election

During the 2015 Labour party leadership election it emerged that 260 former candidates from the Green Party, Left Unity and the Trade Union and Socialist Coalition had attempted to become registered supporters, but were subsequently blocked from voting. Shortly before this, it was revealed that Conservative MP and former junior minister Tim Loughton had been caught applying to become a registered Labour supporter, subsequently claiming that his intention was to "blow the gaff on what a complete farce the whole thing is". Veteran Labour MP Barry Sheerman also joined calls for the election to be "paused" over the fears of infiltration by other parties. The Labour Party told representatives of the four candidates at a meeting on 11 August that 1,200 members and supporters of other parties had been excluded and a further 800 were under investigation. Harriet Harman at the time admitted that as many as 100,000 people may be blocked from voting.

The number of those rejected eventually reached 56,000, around 9.1 per cent of the 610,753 considered eligible to vote at the start of the contest. According to the party, 45,000 of those were rejected for not being on the electoral register.

Labour also confirmed that it would cancel supporters' votes after they had been cast, if it was found that they were members of other parties. A number of high-profile individuals have been blocked from voting, including Marcus Chown, Jeremy Hardy, Douglas Henshall, Ken Loach, Francesca Martinez, Mark Serwotka, Pete Sinclair, Mark Steel, Luke Wright and Toby Young.

Andrew MacKinlay, a former Labour MP, further alleged that Labour was attempting to rig its own leadership election against Corbyn; a view shared by Jeremy Hardy. Such allegations became known to the media – and particularly Corbyn supporters – as the "Labour Purge", with #LabourPurge trending on Twitter. Claims of such a "purge" of Corbyn supporters were rejected by Harman who insisted that the exclusion processes were impartial to candidates. Scottish newspaper The National printed a page-long satirical cartoon speculating further vote-rigging by Labour's leadership.

Brexit 

Political realignments in the Brexit process led to Ann Widdecombe being expelled from the Conservatives after she defected to the Brexit Party in the 2019 European elections to run for MEP. Michael Heseltine has the whip removed after expressing his intention to vote Liberal Democrat. Conservative policy appears to make such expulsions discretionary. despite threats from Conservative Campaign Headquarters.

Tony Blair's support from pro-remain parties led to questions why he had not been expelled from the Labour Party. Alastair Campbell was expelled from the Labour Party after saying he voted for the Liberal Democrats in the 2019 European election. Many Labour members came out in support of Campbell using the hashtag #expelmetoo reporting they had similar voted for the Liberal Democrats or other remain parties.

Criteria for membership

See also 
 List of political parties in the United Kingdom
 List of elected British politicians who have changed party affiliation
 Politics of the United Kingdom

Notes and references

Politics of the United Kingdom
 
United Kingdom politics-related lists
Political parties in the United Kingdom